The 1966 Chicago Cubs season was the 95th season of the Chicago Cubs franchise, the 91st in the National League and the 51st at Wrigley Field. The Cubs finished tenth and last in the National League with a record of 59–103, 36 games behind the NL Champion Los Angeles Dodgers. The Cubs would not lose 100 or more games in a season for another 46 seasons. One of the defining trades in Cubs history occurred on April 21, when the Cubs acquired future Cy Young Award winner Ferguson Jenkins in a trade with the Philadelphia Phillies.

Offseason 
 December 2, 1965: Lindy McDaniel and Don Landrum were traded by the Cubs to the San Francisco Giants for Randy Hundley and Bill Hands.
 January 10, 1966: Doug Clemens was traded by the Cubs to the Philadelphia Phillies for Wes Covington.

Regular season

Season standings

Record vs. opponents

Notable transactions 
 April 21, 1966: Larry Jackson and Bob Buhl were traded by the Cubs to the Philadelphia Phillies for Ferguson Jenkins, John Herrnstein and Adolfo Phillips.
 April 28, 1966: Bobby Cox and cash were traded by the Cubs to the Atlanta Braves for Billy Cowan.
 May 14, 1966: Frank Thomas was signed as a free agent by the Cubs.
 May 28, 1966: Wes Covington was released by the Cubs.
 May 29, 1966: John Herrnstein was traded by the Cubs to the Atlanta Braves for Marty Keough and Arnold Earley.
 June 4, 1966: Frank Thomas was released by the Cubs.
 June 22, 1966: Billy Cowan was traded by the Cubs to the Philadelphia Phillies for Norm Gigon.

Roster

Player stats

Batting

Starters by position 
Note: G = Games played; AB = At bats; H = Hits; Avg. = Batting average; HR = Home runs; RBI = Runs batted in

Other batters 
Note: G = Games played; AB = At bats; H = Hits; Avg. = Batting average; HR = Home runs; RBI = Runs batted in

Pitching

Starting pitchers 
Note: G = Games pitched; IP = Innings pitched; W = Wins; L = Losses; ERA = Earned run average; SO = Strikeouts

Other pitchers 
Note: G = Games pitched; IP = Innings pitched; W = Wins; L = Losses; ERA = Earned run average; SO = Strikeouts

Relief pitchers 
Note: G = Games pitched; W = Wins; L = Losses; SV = Saves; ERA = Earned run average; SO = Strikeouts

Farm system

Notes

References 

1966 Chicago Cubs season at Baseball Reference

Chicago Cubs seasons
Chicago Cubs season
Chicago Cubs